Waris may refer to:

People 
Abdul Majeed Waris (born 1991), Ghanaian footballer
Manmohan Waris (born 1967), Indian Punjabi folk/pop singer
Ruqaiyyah Waris Maqsood (born 1942), British author
Syed Mohammad Waris Hasan Naqvi (died 2008), Indian Shia cleric 
Waris Ahluwalia (born 1974), Indian-American designer and actor
Waris Ali Mirza (1901–1969), last Nawab of Murshidabad
Waris Ali Shah (1819–1905), Indian saint
Waris Baig, Pakistani singer
Waris Dirie (born 1965), Somali model, author, actress and human rights activist
Waris Hussein (born 1938), British-Indian television and film director
Waris Shah (1722–1798), Punjabi poet

Other uses 
"Ajj Aakhaan Waris Shah Nu", Punjabi poem
Heer Ranjha by Waris Shah, Punjabi folklore
Kot Waris, Pakistani village
Waris (serial), a 1979 Pakistani television drama serial broadcast on PTV
Waris Jari Hantu, 2007 Malaysian horror film
Waris language, Papuan language
Waris (film) a Hindi language film
Waris Shah: Ishq Daa Waaris, a 2006 Punjabi language film

See also 
Varis
Wari (disambiguation)